Paddy Small is a Gaelic footballer who plays for the Ballymun Kickhams club and at senior level for the Dublin county team. He usually plays as a half-forward.

References

Living people
Year of birth missing (living people)
Ballymun Kickhams Gaelic footballers
Dublin inter-county Gaelic footballers
Sportspeople from Dublin (city)